The 4th Rallye de France Alsace was the eleventh round of the 2013 World Rally Championship, held from 3 to 6 October, 2013. Sébastien Ogier once again won the rally.

Results

Event standings 

 - The Junior WRC contests only the first 14 stages of the rally.

Special Stages

Power Stage 
The "Power Stage" was a 4.55 km (2.87 mi) stage at the beginning of the rally.

Standings after the rally 

Drivers' Championship standings

Manufacturers' Championship standings

Other 

WRC-2 Drivers' Championship standings

WRC-3 Drivers' Championship standings

JWRC Drivers' Championship standings

References 
 Rallye de France-Alsace 2013 - juwra.com
 4. Rallye de France-Alsace 2013 - ewrc-results.com

2013 World Rally Championship season
Rallye de France Alsace
2013 in French motorsport